Los Guerrilleros is a 1965 Argentine film directed by Lucas Demare.

Cast
 Martín Andrade
 Carlos Víctor Andriss
 Ernesto Bianco
 Juan Buryúa Rey as Gendarme 2
 Rafael Chumbito as Gendarme 3
 Luis Corradi as Chofer
 María José Demare
 Arturo García Buhr
 José María Langlais
 Enrique Liporace
 Víctor Martucci as Padre de Fernando
 Luis Medina Castro
 Reynaldo Mompel
 Bárbara Mujica
 Ignacio Quirós
 Marilina Ross
 Raúl Szabó
 Olga Zubarry

External links
 

1965 films
1960s Spanish-language films
Argentine black-and-white films
Films directed by Lucas Demare
Argentine drama films
1960s Argentine films